A partial solar eclipse will occur on Tuesday, February 16, 2083.

Related eclipses

Solar eclipses 2080–2083

Metonic series 
 All eclipses in this table occur at the Moon's ascending node.

References

External links 

2083 in science
2083 2 16
2083 2 16